"Perfect Sense, Part I" and "Perfect Sense, Part II" are the third and fourth tracks from the concept album Amused to Death by ex-Pink Floyd member Roger Waters. The songs are sung partially by Roger Waters but mainly by PP Arnold on both the original album and live shows.

Overview
Part I of the song begins with a loud and unintelligible rant cutting out the noise of the previous track, "What God Wants, Part I". Following this is a backwards spoken message:

The message climaxes with Waters yelling in the aggressive Scottish voice he used to depict the character of the teacher in The Wall. This is not the first example of Roger Waters using reversed messages in his musical work. In an interview with Rockline on 8 February 1993 Roger Waters stated that he had wanted to use samples of HAL 9000 from 2001: A Space Odyssey on the album. Stanley Kubrick, the director, turned him down on the basis that it would open the door to too many other people using the sound sample. Since this incident Waters has used the audio of HAL describing his mind being taken away during the introduction of "Perfect Sense, Part I" in live performances, such as the In the Flesh tour in 2002, after Kubrick had died.

The opening lines of the song begin with a reference from the film 2001: A Space Odyssey in which "The monkey sat on a pile of stones and stared at the broken bone in his hand". This monkey – the human being – is referred to continuously throughout the album.

In Part II, famed sportscaster Marv Albert commentates a war as if it were a basketball game.

Both parts of the song were performed as part of Waters' In the Flesh tour. In 2000, a recording of this was released as the fifth track of the second disk of the live album, In the Flesh – Live. Both parts were released as one track, titled "Perfect Sense, Pt. 1 & 2", with a length of 7:26.

In the 2015 re-released and remastered edition of the album, the samples of HAL 9000 were finally included, and the backwards message omitted.

Personnel

Amused to Death Version 
Roger Waters - co-lead vocals, synthesizers (only part II)
 P.P. Arnold – co lead vocals
 Marv Albert – commentary (only part II)
 Patrick Leonard - keyboards, speech (only part II)
John Dupree – arrangements
 B.J. Cole – pedal steel guitar
 Steve Lukather – guitar
 Rick DiFonso – guitar
 Bruce Gaitsch – acoustic guitar
 Jimmy Johnson – bass
 Brian Macleod – snare, hi-hat
 Graham Broad – drums 
 Luis Conte – percussion

In the Flesh tour version 

 Roger Waters – co-lead vocals
 P. P. Arnold – co-lead vocals
 Doyle Bramhall II – electric guitar, backing vocals (1999-2000 dates)
 Chester Kamen - electric guitar, backing vocals (2002 dates)
 Snowy White – electric guitar
 Andy Fairweather Low – bass guitar
 Jon Carin – piano, backing vocals (1999-2000 dates)
 Harry Waters - Piano (2002 dates)
 Andy Wallace – keyboards 
 Katie Kissoon – backing vocals
 Susannah Melvoin – backing vocals (1999-2000 dates)
 Linda Lewis – backing vocals (first leg 2002 dates)
 Carol Kenyon – backing vocals (second leg 2002 dates)
 Graham Broad – drums, percussion

The Dark Side of the Moon Live Version 

 Roger Waters – co-lead vocals,
 P.P. Arnold – co-lead vocals 
 Dave Kilminster – electric guitar, backing vocals
 Snowy White – electric guitar
 Andy Fairweather-Low – bass guitar (2006-07 dates)
 Chester Kamen – bass guitar (2008 dates)
 Jon Carin – piano, backing vocals 
 Harry Waters – keyboards
 Carol Kenyon – backing vocals
 Katie Kissoon – backing vocals (2006-07 dates)
 Sylvia Mason-James - backing vocals (2008 dates)
 Graham Broad – drums, percussion

References

Roger Waters songs
1992 songs
Songs written by Roger Waters